The following streetcar lines once operated in Westchester County, New York. Many systems in Westchester eventually came under control of either the Third Avenue Railway, the Fifth Avenue Coach Company, or the Connecticut Company-owned New York and Stamford Railway.

Streetcar Lines in Westchester County

 Ossining Electric Railway
 Westchester Traction Company (successor to Ossining Electric Railway)
 Hudson River and Eastern Traction Company (Ossining)
 Peekskill Lighting and Railroad Company (successor to Peekskill Traction Company)
 Putnam and Westchester Traction Company (Peekskill and Putnam Valley)
 New York and Stamford Railway
 Tarrytown, White Plains and Mamaroneck Railway (successor to the New York, Elmsford and White Plains Railway)
 Yonkers Railroad (a consolidation of the North and South Electric Railway and the Yonkers and Tarrytown Electric Railroad)
 Third Avenue Railway
 New York, Westchester and Connecticut Traction (Mount Vernon and Pelham)
 Westchester Electric Railroad (combination of the Mount Vernon and Eastchester Railway and the New Rochelle Railway Transit Company)

References

External links
Transit System in New York: New York City Area (ChicagoRailfan)
Vintage Westchester County (BusTalk)

 
Transportation in Westchester County, New York
New York (state) railroads
Defunct public transport operators in the United States
Westchester